Proprioseiopsis gelikmani is a species of mite in the family Phytoseiidae.

References

gelikmani
Articles created by Qbugbot
Animals described in 1970